Wish is the ninth studio album by English rock band the Cure, released on 21 April 1992 by Fiction Records in the United Kingdom and Elektra Records in the United States. Wish was the Cure's most commercially successful in the band's career, debuting at number one in the UK and number two in the US, where it sold more than 1.2 million copies.

On 25 November 2022, a remastered 30th-anniversary deluxe edition of Wish was released, containing four previously unreleased demos with vocals, instrumental demos, the Lost Wishes instrumental Cassette and remix versions.

Recording 
The record is the final studio album featuring drummer Boris Williams and the first featuring Perry Bamonte, who was initially working as a roadie for the band, as well as being the last album featuring guitarist Porl Thompson for sixteen years.

Whilst retaining their trademark gothic rock sound and mood on some tracks, Wish often found the band emphasizing the lighter, broader guitar-driven alternative rock direction that was hinted on their previous three records. According to Thompson, Wish was recorded on 48 tracks and "almost everything was used". Robert Smith also revealed the hit song "Friday I'm in Love" was purposely sped up a quarter-tone sharp on the recording tape, halfway between D and E-flat. Smith commented on the speeding up of the tape of the song in a 1993 interview: "[…] that was an accident. I was playing with the vari-speed and forgot to turn it off. But the whole feel changed, and the fact that it's the only song on Wish that's not in concert pitch really lifts it out and makes it sound different. After working on the record for months, hearing something a quarter-tone off makes your brain take a step backwards." Smith also revealed that the "detuning" of the guitars played a role in the unique "sound" of the album, as did the subliminal overdubs and the extensive use of feedback. "A lot of things on our record that sound like heavy chorusing are actually just detuned instruments. The only drawback to that is onstage it's very confusing sometimes, especially with lots of phasing effects going on. It turns into this overwhelming pulsing sound, and you can't hear anything."

Smith also revealed that the songs "Mesmerise" by Chapterhouse, and "Human" by The Human League were an influence on the album, he commented on both songs in 1993: "For every album we do, I assemble a bunch of songs that have something that I'm trying to capture. For Wish, I would listen to 'Mesmerise' by Chapterhouse for its feeling of abandon and 'Human' by The Human League. You couldn't spot anything sonically or structurally that would influence anything we did, but there's an indefinable something that I'm trying to capture. One night I must have played 'Mesmerise' 20 times, drinking and turning it louder and louder, putting myself into a trance."

Release 

The album's lead single was "High", released on 16 March 1992. The single peaked at number eight on the UK Singles Chart, number 42 on the US Billboard Hot 100, and number one on the Billboard Modern Rock Tracks chart. The album's second single, "Friday I'm in Love", was released on 15 May 1992, a Friday, later reaching number six on the UK Singles Chart, number 18 on the Billboard Hot 100, and number one on the Modern Rock Tracks chart. The final single was "A Letter to Elise", issued on 5 October 1992. This song reached number twenty-eight in the UK and number two on the Modern Rock Tracks chart.

Wish was released on 21 April. It received positive reviews upon release, including a four-star review in Rolling Stone that stated: "For its cult of millions, the Cure offers the only kind of optimism that makes sense." Wish was also the band's overall highest-charting album, and most commercially successful in the band's career. Upon release, Wish would soon debut at number one on the UK Albums Chart, and number two on the US Billboard 200, where it sold more than 1.2 million copies. It also reached number one on Cash Box Top 200 Pop Albums chart in the US on 16 May 1992. Wish was nominated for the Grammy Award for Best Alternative Music Album in 1993.

On 16 November 1993, a limited-edition EP titled Lost Wishes was released on cassette with four new tracks on it.

In 1995, Q included Wish in its publication "In Our Lifetime: Qs 100 Best Albums 1986–94", a list compiled to celebrate its 100th issue.

In 2000 it was voted number 646 in Colin Larkin's All Time Top 1000 Albums.

Reissues
On 13 April 2018, in an interview with BBC Radio 6 Music, Robert Smith confirmed that the deluxe edition of Wish is finished. On 28 July 2022, the band announced a remastered and expanded 30th-anniversary deluxe edition of Wish, containing 24 previously unreleased demos, out-takes, the Lost Wishes EP and as well a collection of 12-inch remixes of all three singles from the Wish period. The recordings were remastered by Smith and Miles Showell at Abbey Road Studios.

This special edition was released on November 25 and features the remastered album, four demos with vocals, instrumental demos, the Lost Wishes instrumental EP and remix versions.

Track listing
All songs composed by the Cure (Perry Bamonte, Simon Gallup, Robert Smith, Porl Thompson, Boris Williams).

2022 Deluxe Edition

Personnel
All credits taken from liner notes 

The Cure
Robert Smith – vocals, guitars, six-string bass, keyboards
Perry Bamonte – guitars, keyboards, six-string bass on "Friday I'm In Love" and "A Letter to Elise"
Porl Thompson – guitars
Simon Gallup – bass guitar
Boris Williams – drums, percussion

Additional musicians
Kate Wilkinson – viola on "To Wish Impossible Things"

Production
Producers: Dave Allen, the Cure
Engineers: Dave Allen, Steve Whitfield
Assistant engineer: Chris Bandy
Mixing: Mark Saunders
Mixing assistants: Andy Baker, William Parry, Danton Supple, Mark Warner
Album cover: Parched Art (Porl Thompson and Andy Vella)

Charts

Weekly charts

Year-end charts

Certifications and sales

References 

1992 albums
Albums produced by David M. Allen
The Cure albums
Jangle pop albums
Elektra Records albums
Fiction Records albums